The Nation of Lunda (c. 1665 – c. 1887) was a confederation of states in what is now the Democratic Republic of Congo, north-eastern Angola, and north-western Zambia, its central state was in Katanga.

Origin
Initially, the core of what would become the Lunda confederation was a commune called a N'Gaange in the kiLunda (kiyaka-kipunu) language. It was ruled over by a monarch called the Mwane-a- n'Gaange. One of these rulers, Ilunga Tshibinda, came from the nation of Luba where his brother ruled and married a royal woman from a nation to their south. Their son became the first paramount ruler of the Lunda, creating the title of Mwane-a-Yamvu (c. 1665).

Apex
The Lunda Kingdom controlled some 150,000 km2 by 1680. The state doubled in size to around 300,000 km2 at its height in the nineteenth century. The Mwane-a Yamvo of Lunda became powerful militarily from their base of 175,000 inhabitants. Along with this military strength through sheer numbers, the Lunda Kingdom also received Muslim military advisors and some dated weapons from the cities of Nyangwe and Kabambare. Through marriage with descendants of the Luba kings, they gained political ties. 

The Lunda people were able to settle and colonialize other areas and tribes, thus extending their kingdom through southwest Katanga into Angola and north-western Zambia, and eastwards across Katanga into what is now the Luapula Province of Zambia. The kingdom became a confederation of a number of chieftainships that enjoyed a degree of local autonomy (as long as tributes were paid), with Mwata Yamvo as paramount ruler and a ruling council (following the Luba model) to assist with administration.

The strength of the kingdom enabled it to conquer the territory of other tribes, especially to the east. In the eighteenth century, a number of migrations took place as far as the region to the south of Lake Tanganyika. The Bemba people of Northern Zambia descended from Luba migrants who arrived in Zambia throughout the seventeenth century. At the same time, a Lunda chief and warrior called Mwata Kazembe set up an Eastern Lunda kingdom in the valley of the Luapula River.

Collapse
The kingdom of Lunda came to an end in the nineteenth century, when it was invaded by the Chokwe, who were armed with guns. The Chokwe then established their own kingdom with their language and customs. Lunda chiefs and people continued to live in the Lunda heartland but were diminished in power. 

At the start of the colonial era (1884), the Lunda heartland was divided between Portuguese Angola, King Leopold II of Belgium's Congo Free State and the British in North-Western Rhodesia, which became Angola, DR Congo and Zambia respectively. The Lunda groups in Northern Rhodesia were led by two prominent chiefs; Ishindi and Kazembe Kazembi), with Ishindi establishing his kingdom in the North-Western of the country and Kazembe in the North-East. Of the two prominent chiefs, Ishindi was the first born of Mwanta Yamvo which Kazembe was made King as a result of reward for his loyalty to Mwanta Yamvo.

See also
List of rulers of the Lunda Empire
Luba Empire

References

Pogge, Im Reich des Muata Jamwo (Berl. 1880);
Buchner, Das Reich des Muata Jamwo (in "Deutsche Geographische Blätter", Brem. 1883

Sources

Further reading
LIBRARY OF CONGRESS 1989f "Lunda and Chokwe Kingdoms" IN Country Study: Angola (October 2005) [www] http://lcweb2.loc.gov
Art and Life in Africa Project, The University of Iowa School of Art and Art History: "Lunda Information." https://web.archive.org/web/20070125235118/http://www.uiowa.edu/~africart/ 03 Nov. 1998.

Countries in precolonial Africa
Political history of the Democratic Republic of the Congo
17th century in Africa
History of Katanga
Chieftainships
Former kingdoms
Former confederations